The World Junior Alpine Skiing Championships 2010 were the 29th World Junior Alpine Skiing Championships, held between 30 January and 5 February 2010 in Les Houches, Megève and Les Plandras, France.

Medal winners

Men's events

Women's events

Two silver medals were awarded in the Giant Slalom.

External links
World Junior Alpine Skiing Championships 2010 results at fis-ski.com

World Junior Alpine Skiing Championships
2010 in alpine skiing
Alpine skiing competitions in France
2010 in French sport